Statistics of the Swiss National League A in the 1991–92 football season.

Overview
It was contested by 12 teams, and FC Sion won the championship.

First stage

Table

Results

Second stage

Championship group

Table

Results

Promotion/relegation group

Group A

Table

Results

Group B

Table

Results

Sources
 Switzerland 1991–92 at RSSSF

Swiss Football League seasons
Swiss
1991–92 in Swiss football